Gießen Licher Straße is a station in Gießen, Hesse, Germany on the Vogelsberg Railway.

Rail services
The station is served daily by hourly Regionalbahn (RB 45) services on the Limburg (Lahn)–Weilburg–Wetzlar–Gießen–Alsfeld (Oberhess)–Fulda route. In the peak, additional Regionalbahn services run on the Gießen–Grünberg–Mücke route.

Notes

Giessen
Railway stations in Hesse
Buildings and structures in Giessen (district)